Anna Belle Francis (born 1978) is a Singaporean entertainer and singer of Eurasian ethnicity. First emerging into the entertainment scene as a young child, Francis has a prolific portfolio, having recorded many songs and produced and starred in many films and plays.

Early life
A Eurasian, Francis was born 1978 in Singapore, to "a family with a strong and popular musical background". Her father was a drummer. Her Aunty, Irene Francis was a well known singer in the 70's and 80's including her Uncle, Stephen Francis, a pianist till today. She grew up watching her family perform on TV and stage.

Career
As a young child, Francis started out her entertainment career as a theatrical actor with Act 3, Singapore’s first Theatre for Children. She then started embarked onto the Screens when she hosted her debut TV show, Vidz, where she presented music videos and interviewed international artistes. She then started acting in TV series and sitcoms such as Triple Nine, Growing Up, Three Rooms and many others. She also was in a feature film, Forever Fever by Glen Goei.

Among other projects, she starred as a girl whose husband has already been chosen for her in the Peranakan stage play Bedrooms from late-November to mid-December 2009 and other stage performances including "Love Pukes".

For a while she took a hiatus in her acting career, assumingly to focus more on her first two children. However, in 2004, Francis founded a performing arts institution Trinaqi.  Francis then co-established Soul Theory Studios, a Hip Hop academy and movement with her spouse Sheikh Haikel.

She has also produced a handful of projects and events with National Arts Council and People's association including Dick Lee's Euranasia Concert.

As a host, Francis has hosted many high-profile events, such as the 2007 National Day Parade and the 2010 Youth Olympic Games. Together with her husband, she hosted Knockout, Knockout All-Stars, and Knockout Carnival, all of which were broadcast on Okto.

Francis is co-director of School of Music Singapore, which was founded in 2013, alongside her husband. As a professional singer, Francis has recorded numerous tracks, plenty of which are duets with her husband.

Personal life
Francis married Singaporean rapper, radio personality and actor Sheikh Haikel in around 2000. They have three children – one daughter Triqka (born 2003) and one son Abbra (born 2004) and just recently, a new addition to their family, Juz (born 2014).

References

External links
 
 

1978 births
Living people
Singaporean actresses
21st-century Singaporean women singers
Singaporean people of European descent